The Cathedral of Mary, Mother of the Church also Mostar Catholic Cathedral in Mostar is one of four Roman Catholic cathedrals in Bosnia and Herzegovina. It is the seat of the Mostar-Duvno Bishopric currently led by Bishop Petar Palić.

The construction of the new cathedral in a modern style began in 1974 with the excavations for the foundations. The project was completed in the summer of 1980, partly due to delays, changes in the original plan and architectural defects found in the presbytery area. The interior is decorated with stained glass and mosaics. During the Bosnian War the church was greatly damaged. Later it was rebuilt in its entirety.

Gallery

References

External links
Katedrala Mostar

Roman Catholic cathedrals in Bosnia and Herzegovina